Batcheldor is a surname. Notable people with the surname include:

Daniel Batcheldor (born 1978), Anglo-American astrophysicist
Kenneth Batcheldor (1921–1988), British clinical psychologist